The FIRST Global Challenge is a yearly Olympics-style robotics competition organized by the International First Committee Association. It promotes STEM education and careers for youth and was created by Dean Kamen in 2016 as an expansion of FIRST, an organization with similar objectives.

History 
FIRST Global is a trade name for the International First Committee Association, a nonprofit corporation based in Manchester, New Hampshire, with a 501(c)3 designation from the IRS.

The nonprofit was founded by the co-founder of FIRST, Dean Kamen, with the objective of promoting STEM education and careers in the developing world through Olympics-style robotics competitions. Former US Congressman, Joe Sestak is the organization's president.

Each year, the FIRST Global Challenge is held in a different city. For example, Mexico City was selected to host the 2018 Challenge after the United States hosted the 2017 edition in Washington, DC. This is a change from FIRST's system of championships, where one city hosts for several years at a time, and more closely follows the design of the Olympic Games.

In May 2020, it was announced that FIRST Global would not host a traditional challenge in 2020 due to the COVID-19 pandemic.

Editions

Washington, D.C. 2017
The 2017 FIRST Global Challenge was held in Washington, D.C., from July 16–18, and the challenge was the use of robots to separate different colored balls, representing clean water and impurities in water, symbolizing the Engineering Grand Challenge (based on the Millennium Development Goal) of improving access to clean water in the developing world. Around 160 teams composed of 15- to 18-year-olds from 157 countries participated, and around 60% of teams were created or led by young women. Six continental teams also participated.

Mexico City 2018

The 2018 FIRST Global Challenge was held in Mexico City from August 15–18. The 2018 Challenge was called Energy Impact and explored the impact of various types of energy on the world and how they can be made more sustainable. In the challenge, robots worked together in teams of three to give cubes to human players, turn a crank, and score cubes in goals in order to generate electrical power. The challenge was based on three Engineering Grand Challenges; making solar energy affordable, making fusion energy a reality, and creating carbon sequestration methods.

Dubai 2019
The 2019 challenge, called Ocean Opportunities, was held in Dubai from October 24–27 and was the first challenge hosted outside of North America. The challenge was themed around clearing the ocean of pollutants, and had two alliances of three teams each attempting to score large and small balls representing pollutants into processing areas and a processing barge. The processing barge had multiple levels, with higher levels worth more points. At the end of the match, robots "docked" with the barge by driving onto or climbing up it, with climbing worth more points. The event was opened by Sheikh Hamdan bin Mohammed Al Maktoum, Crown Prince of Dubai.

Geneva 2022
The 2022 challenge called Carbon Capture, is being held in Geneva from October 13–16. The challenge was themed around capturing carbon particles (CO2) from the atmosphere. In the Carbon Capture game, six different countries work together to capture and store black balls ( Carbon ). The storage tower had multiple rod that the robots can climb on, with the higher rod worth more multiplier. At the end of a match the robots needs to be docked on the storage tower's base or climb up the bars with their alliance ball. In a match there is Two alliance each consisting of three country.

Global STEM Corps 
The Global STEM Corps is a FIRST Global initiative that connects qualified volunteer mentors with students in developing countries to prepare them for competitions.

References

External links 
 

Educational organizations based in the United States

Organizations established in 2016
Robotics
Robotics organizations
Technology organizations